Sri Satya Sai University Of Technology And Medical Sciences (SSSUTMS) is a private university located in Sehore in Madhya Pradesh, India. Many students come to study from different states of India.

History 
Sri Satya Sai Campus, Sehore came into existence in year 1999 with Sri Satya Sai Institute of Science & Technology (SSSIST). SSSIST initially had three branches in engineering education with total intake of 180.

In 2012, because of the vision of promoters, the Sehore Campus was operating twelve Colleges, having twenty undergraduate courses & twenty Postgraduate courses, one post-graduate Diploma course & one Diploma course, with total intake of 3054  students. Sri Satya Sai Group of Institutions attracts large number of students from faraway places & States, due to quality of education at affordable cost, without any hidden fees policy. In its history of fourteen years, various Institutions under umbrella of Sri Satya Sai Group of Institutions were the only Institutes in Sehore & nearby six districts offering Technical education at affordable fees to worthy & needy student.

Campus
The university campus is spread over 180 acres in Pachama Village on the Sehore District - Madhya Pradesh.

Location 

Schools
SSSUTMS has the following schools:
 School of Engineering
 School of Computer Application
 School of Management Studies
 Faculty of Pharmacy
 School of Hotel Management
 School of Paramedical Studies
 Polytechnic (Engineering)
 School of Law
 School of Homoeopathy
 Faculty of Education
 School of Design
 School of Ayurveda & Siddha Studies

Hostels 
For resident students a boy's hostel and a girl's hostel are available on the campus. Each Hostel is self-contained with amenities such as a reading room, an indoor games room, a lounge and a dining hall with a mess, a computer room and a TV in the common room. The Board for Hostel Management coordinates the various hostel activities. At present, The Boy's Hostel has a capacity of accommodating 252 students and the Girl's Hostel has a capacity of 100 girls. The mess of both Hostels is run on a cooperative basis. Provision of separate rooms with air-conditioners is available.

See also 
 List of universities in India
 Universities and colleges in India

References

External links 

2014 establishments in Madhya Pradesh
Universities in Madhya Pradesh
 Educational institutions established in 2014